Charles Dight may refer to:

 Charles Dight (Australian businessman) (Charles Hilton Dight, 1813–1852), flour-miller and member of the Victorian Legislative Council, 1851–1852
 Charles Dight (New South Wales politician) (Charles Hilton Dight, 1843–1918), nephew of the above and member of the New South Wales Legislative Assembly, 1898–1904
 Charles Fremont Dight (1856–1938), American medical professor